Frank Ellis Jr. is a former American football coach and college athletics administrator. He served as the head football coach at his alma mater, Savannah State University, from 1977 to 1985, compiling a record of 34–56–2.  Ellis was also the athletic director as Savannah State from 1994 to 1996.

Ellis played football and basketball at Savannah State in the 1960s.

Head coaching record

References

Year of birth missing (living people)
Living people
American football defensive backs
American football halfbacks
American football quarterbacks
Savannah State Tigers and Lady Tigers athletic directors
Savannah State Tigers basketball players
Savannah State Tigers football coaches
Savannah State Tigers football players
African-American coaches of American football
African-American players of American football
African-American basketball players
African-American college athletic directors in the United States
21st-century African-American people